The Stabian Baths are an ancient Roman bathing complex in Pompeii, Italy, the oldest and the largest of the 5 public baths in the city. Their original construction dates back to ca. 125 BC, making them one of the oldest bathing complexes known from the ancient world. They were remodeled and enlarged many times up to the eruption of Vesuvius in 79 AD.

Description 

The Stabian Baths are located off the intersection of two main streets in Pompeii: the Via dell'Abbondanza to the south and the Via Stabiana to the east (the latter gives them their modern name). On the west side, the baths are bordered by the Vicolo del Lupanare, and to the north by the house of P. Vedius Siricus. As was typical of ancient Roman bathhouses, the facilities were divided by sex. The main entrance was from the Via dell'Abbondanza, through a vestibule (1) into the palaestra (2), a large open-air exercise ground. A row of shops fronted the street. On the right-hand side of the palaestra was a colonnade which screened the entrance to the men's bathing chambers: the apodyterium (changing room) (25), followed by the frigidarium (cold room) (22), tepidarium (warm room) (23), and caldarium (hot room) (21). These chambers were rectangular, barrel-vaulted, and parallel to one another. The arrangement is known as the 'single-axis row type', the most common model for baths adopted all over the Roman world.

On the left-hand side of the palaestra was a swimming pool (natatio) (6). The rooms which flanked this pool had garden frescoes painted on the walls above a marble dado. Women had a separate entrance off the Vicolo del Lupanare – the world Mulier (woman) was found painted over this doorway when the baths were first excavated. The women's side had the same facilities with the exception of the frigidarium, but the chambers were smaller and much plainer in terms of decoration. In place of the cold room, there was a large cold water basin built at one end of the apodyterium (16). The women's hot room (19) contains a large marble-lined basin (alveus), about 2 feet deep and with a sloped back for the bathers to rest against. The remains of a bronze single bath and bronze benches were found when the room was excavated. The walls and floors of the warm and hot rooms were heated by a hypocaust heating system – the earliest surviving example from the Roman world. The heat was produced from a single furnace, and circulated in the space under the floors, which were raised on tile pillars. The furnace was located between the two caldaria (20); there were three water tanks in this room, one for hot water directly above the furnace, one for lukewarm water, and one for cold.

The men's apodyterium is paved in gray marble bordered by basalt along the walls. The walls were painted in white with a red base, and above them the vaulted ceiling was plastered in elaborate stucco, made up of octagonal, hexagonal and quadrangular panels. They featured cupids, trophies, rosettes, and Bacchic figures. The ceiling of the men's tepidarium featured similar stuccowork. The men's frigidarium is a round room with a dome, at the center of which is an oculus which allows light to enter the room. The cold-water basin, which is lined in white marble, is edged by a narrow marble floor. The walls are inset with niches containing fountains. The walls were painted with a beautiful garden fresco, showing vegetation, birds, statues, and vases against a sky-blue background. At one end of the men's tepidarium was a basin, which Mau reckoned was a "moderately cold bath" for "those who in the winter shrank from using the frigidarium". Both hot rooms contained a labrum, a large, elevated, shallow basin filled with lukewarm water. Only the base of the labrum remains in the men's hot room, but the women's is intact.

History 
The baths were first constructed ca. 125 BC. A sundial found on the site, with an inscription in Oscan, commemorates the magistrate who had the first bath building constructed using fines levied by the local administration. Even before the construction of this building, the site was used primarily as a palaestra; the trapezoidal shape of the palaestra existed as far back as the fourth century BC. There were also small chambers containing hip baths to the north during this early period.

By the time Pompeii became a Roman colony in 80 BC, the Stabian Baths were already a sizeable building occupying half a city block. The building contained two sets of bath chambers, a latrine, and the palaestra. Water was drawn from a well and stored in a reservoir on the roof. An inscription records that the baths were extended by the duoviri (city magistrates) Caius Uulius and Publius Aninius after the establishment of the colony. They renovated the palaestra and added two new chambers: a laconicum (dry-sweating room), and a destrictarium (room for scraping the body clean with strigils). The work having been undertaken by the duoviri suggests that the Stabian Baths were publicly owned. The laconicum is believed to have later been converted into the frigidarium of the men's section, but the destrictarium has not been identified.

Running water was supplied to the baths for the first time around the turn of the first century AD, when they were connected to the city's aqueduct. It was likely around this time that a house to the west of the palaestra was demolished to make room for an outdoor swimming pool (natatio), ball court, a second changing room, and wings of rooms on either side which were either loggias or contained shallow pools. The shallow pools would have been used by patrons to wash their feet before they entered the swimming pool. Open rooms, probably exedrae, were added to the north wing of the baths facing onto the palaestra.

The Stabian Baths were damaged in the AD 62 Pompeii earthquake, but were rebuilt, enlarged and remodeled to make them even more luxurious than before. The seismic activity in the area rendered the baths especially vulnerable to damage – they appear to have been at least partially closed and undergoing a general repair/remodel when the eruption of Vesuvius took place in 79.

Bibliography
 
 de Albentiis, Emidio (2006). "Social Life: Spectacles, Athletic Games, and Baths," Pompeii. Barnes & Noble Publications.
 Koloski-Ostrow, Anna Olga (2009) "The city baths of Pompeii and Herculaneum," The World of Pompeii. Taylor & Francis; pp. 227-231.
 
 Mau, August & Kelsey, Francis (1902). Pompeii: Its Life and Art. Macmillan, pp 180–195.

References

Buildings and structures completed in the 2nd century BC
Ancient Roman baths in Italy
Pompeii (ancient city)
Ancient Roman buildings and structures in Italy